Giuseppe Mancinelli (17 March 1813, in Naples – 25 May 1875, in Castrocielo) was an Italian painter.

Biography
His father was in the service of the Venitgnano family, who patronized his early studies at the Neapolitan Academy of Fine Arts, then under the guidance of Vincenzo Camuccini. He painted an altarpiece of San Carlo Borromeo provides Viaticum to Plague Victim for the Church of San Carlo all'Arena. After 1850, he was named to replace Tito Angelini as the professor of Design at the Neapolitan Academy, besting out Di Napoli and Raffaele Postiglione in a contest for the position.

He painted the Sipario or theater curtain, for the teatro San Carlo with Muses, Homer, poets, and musicians (1854) to replace the original curtain by Giuseppe Cammarano that had burned in a fire. Among his pupils were Valerio Laccetti, Alfonso Simonetti, Ciro Punzo, and his son Gustavo.

References

1813 births
1875 deaths
19th-century Italian painters
Italian male painters
Painters from Naples
Accademia di Belle Arti di Napoli alumni
Academic staff of the Accademia di Belle Arti di Napoli
19th-century Italian male artists